Wang Jie may refer to:

Musicians
Wang Jie (singer) (born 1962), Hong Kong-Taiwanese singer, also known as Dave Wang
Wang Jie (composer) (born 1980), Chinese-born American composer

Athletes
Wang Jie (beach volleyball) (born 1983), Chinese beach volleyball player
Wang Jie (cyclist) (born 1988), Chinese cyclist
Wang Jie (footballer, born 1982), Chinese association footballer
Wang Jie (footballer, born 1989), Chinese association footballer

See also
Wang Ji (disambiguation)